The Brazil national cricket team is the men's team that represents the country of Brazil in international cricket. The team is organised by the Brazilian Cricket Association, which became an affiliate member of the International Cricket Council (ICC) in 2002 and an associate member in 2017. However, the national side has a history dating back much longer, with its first recorded international match coming against Argentina in 1888. Regular international competition commenced in the 1920s, and resumed in the 1950s after a gap during World War II. Almost all of Brazil's matches have come against other South American sides, although in recent years the team has participated in several ICC Americas tournaments, which include sides from Central America and North America. At the South American Championships, which commenced in 1995, Brazil has played in all but one edition, with a best finish of second at the 1997 tournament.

History
Brazil became an ICC member in 2002. Its ICC tournament debut came in 2006, when Brazil took part in Division Three of the ICC Americas Championship in Suriname. Although Brazil lost all three opening games in that tournament, no doubt due to lack of international exposure, its cricket has developed since then.

Brazil won the 2009 ICC Americas Championship Division Three, winning all of its matches against Belize, Chile and Peru. This victory enabled Brazil to qualify for the 2010 ICC Americas Championship Division Two.

However, Brazil seemingly struggled at this higher level, thus after losing all of their four matches, were relegated to Division Three.

At the South American Championship, Brazil has participated in all but one edition since the tournament began in 1995, with its best finish being second at the 1997 event.

2018–present
In April 2018, the ICC decided to grant full Twenty20 International (T20I) status to all its members. Therefore, all Twenty20 matches played between Brazil and other ICC members since 1 January 2019 have been full T20I matches.

Brazil played their first T20I match against Chile on 3 October 2019 during the 2019 South American Cricket Championship in Peru.

Tournament history

ICC Americas Championship

 2000–04: Did not participate
 2006: 4th place
 2008: 5th place
 2009: Won
 2010: 5th place

South American Championship
 1995: 4th place
 1997: 2nd place
 1999: Group stage
 2000: 3rd place
 2002: 3rd place
 2004: Group stage
 2007: 4th place
 2009: 3rd place
 2011: Did not participate
 2013: 3rd place
 2014: 3rd place
 2015: 2nd place
 2016: 4th place
 2017: 3rd place
 2018: 6th place
 2019: 6th place

Records

International Match Summary — Brazil
 
Last updated 5 October 2019

Twenty20 International 
 Highest team total: 96/5 (12.0 overs) v. Chile on 3 October 2019 at El Cortijo Polo Club, Lima.
 Highest individual score: 52, Muhammad Saleem v. Chile on 3 October 2019 at El Cortijo Polo Club, Lima.
 Best individual bowling figures: 3/15, Luis Rodrigues v. Argentina on 4 October 2019 at El Cortijo Polo Club, Lima.

Most T20I runs for Brazil

Most T20I wickets for Brazil

T20I record versus other nations

Records complete to T20I #916. Last updated 5 October 2019.

Other records
For a list of selected international matches played by Brazil, see Cricket Archive.

Squad
 Rashid Bazigar - Captain
 Daniel Miziara
 Greigor Caisley
 Viki Chaudhry
 Rudy Hartmann
 Ian Webster
 Vincent Bastick
 Guilherme Lefévre
 Henrique Dolabella
 Sunny Randolph
 Alexandre Miziara
 Christopher Johnson
 Amit Rohilla
 Lalit Rohilla
 Himanshu Shokeen 
 Piyush Daksh
 Devender Thepra
 Ankit Solanki

See also
List of Brazil Twenty20 International cricketers
ICC Americas Championship
South American Cricket Championship

References

External links
Brazil at Cricinfo
 Cricket Brasil – Brazilian Cricket Association 
www.brasilcricket.org (archived 2013) 

National cricket teams
Cricket
Brazil in international cricket